Onninu Purake Mattonnu is a 1988 Indian Malayalam-language film, directed by Thulasidas and produced by Sundarlal Nahatha. The film stars Thilakan, Nedumudi Venu, Ratheesh and Rohini in the lead roles. The film has musical score by Kannur Rajan.

Cast
Thilakan
Nedumudi Venu
Ratheesh
Rohini
Devan
M. G. Soman
Mala Aravindan
Santhakumari
Shari

Production 
Mohanlal was initially considered for the main role, however couldn't as his date diary was full.

Soundtrack
The music was composed by Kannur Rajan with lyrics by Poovachal Khader.

References

External links
 

1988 films
1980s Malayalam-language films
Films directed by Thulasidas